Robert Sutton (c.1340 – 1430) was an Irish judge and Crown official. During a career which lasted almost 60 years he served the English Crown in a variety of offices, notably as Deputy to the Lord Chancellor of Ireland, Chief Baron of the Irish Exchequer, Master of the Rolls in Ireland, and Deputy Treasurer of Ireland. A warrant dated 1423 praised him for his "long and laudable" service to the Crown.

Early career 

Little is known of his early life: the surname Sutton has been common in Ireland since the thirteenth century, especially in the south. William Sutton, who acted as his deputy from 1423 onwards and succeeded him as Master of the Rolls in 1430, is thought to have been his nephew. William was a clerk in Crown service by 1404, and became Chief Engrosser (copier) in the Court of Exchequer (Ireland) in 1410.

Robert was appointed to the living of   St. Patrick's Church, Trim (now  Trim  Cathedral) in 1370; later he became Archdeacon of Kells and prebendary of St Patrick's Cathedral, Dublin, and later Prebendary of Ossory. In 1423 he was removed as Archdeacon of Kells, on the ground that he had "unlawfully detained" the office.

Judge 

He was appointed Clerk of the Crown and Hanaper, or chief clerk in the Irish Chancery, about 1373, an office he held jointly with Thomas de Everdon. An order in Council stated that they should share the annual fee of £20. As a judge he served in a variety of offices over many years. He was appointed Master of the Rolls in 1377 and held that office at regular intervals over the next fifty years, at times jointly with Thomas de Everdon: his final warrant of appointment was granted in 1423, and apparently confirmed him in office for life, with a reversion in favour of his nephew William, although Richard Ashwell had succeeded him by 1427.

Richard Ashwell 

Ashwell had been a  senior clerk in the Chancery since at least 1416, when he and Roger Hawkenshaw, justice of the King's Bench ordered to prepare the Chancery writs due to the Lord Chancellor's frequent absences: as such was he highly qualified to be Master. A detailed set of instructions from the Privy Council to  Ashwell in 1427 survives, requiring him to examine the records of a lawsuit in the Court of Common Pleas (Ireland) "in the time of King Henry IV", since many years after the hearing, it was now being alleged that an injustice had been done to the defendant, the Prior of Mullingar.

Later  career 

Robert also served as Deputy Lord Chancellor and Keeper of the Great Seal of Ireland on many occasions and was Deputy Escheator in 1380. In 1408 an extra payment was authorised to him on account of his great "labour, burden, costs and expenses" as Keeper of the Great Seal.Patent Roll 10 Henry IV In the same year he sat on a large commission to inquire into all treasons  committed in County  Wexford. He was appointed Chief Baron of the Irish Exchequer in  1401, but did not serve long. In 1410, while the Lord Chancellor was on assize in the south, Sutton was appointed to hear causes in the Chancellor's Court in Dublin for the benefit of those who dared not travel "on account of the dangers of the roads".

He was also a politician, and was summoned to the Irish Parliament at Kilkenny in 1390. He was Deputy Treasurer in 1403, and was instructed to grant an amnesty to the noted Irish leader Art Mór Mac Murchadha Caomhánach (Art MacMurrough-Kavanagh), King of Leinster, in 1409. In 1420 he witnessed the charter by which King Henry V guaranteed the liberties of the citizens of Dublin.

In 1423 he was praised for his laudable service to five English monarchs. In 1428 his nephew William Sutton was given a very large gift from the Crown of seventy silver pounds, presumably for services rendered. Robert died in 1430, when he must have been 90 or more.

William Sutton 

His nephew William took up office as Master of the Rolls in 1430, having obtained a promise of the office in 1423. He was probably William Sutton (there were other William Suttons in the public service then) who obtained Robert's old position as Clerk of the Crown in 1435. He died in 1437.

References

1430 deaths
Year of birth uncertain
Chief Barons of the Irish Exchequer
Masters of the Rolls in Ireland
Archdeacons of Kells